Sphaeniscus is a genus of tephritid  or fruit flies in the family Tephritidae.

Species
Sphaeniscus atilius (Walker, 1849)
Sphaeniscus binoculatus (Bezzi, 1928)
Sphaeniscus filiolus (Loew, 1869)
Sphaeniscus lindbergi Hering, 1958
Sphaeniscus melanotrichotus Hering, 1956
Sphaeniscus quadrincisus (Wiedemann, 1824)
Sphaeniscus sexmaculatus (Macquart, 1843)
Sphaeniscus trifasciatus Korneyev & Dirlbek, 2000

References

Tephritinae
Tephritidae genera
Diptera of Africa
Diptera of Australasia